Pearl Dairy Farms Limited, often referred to as Pearl Dairy, is a dairy processing company in Uganda.

Location
The coordinates of the company headquarters and factory are:
0°33'49.0"S, 30°42'11.0"E (Latitude:-0.563611; Longitude:30.703056).

Overview
The milk is purchased from dairy farmers in Mbarara District and neighboring communities. The company maintains corporate offices in Kampala and Dubai. Pearl Dairy Farms Limited maintains a subsidiary in Kenya. As of 2015, the company had plans to construct a milk processing plant of its own in the county. Until that factory is built, the company markets dairy products in Kenya, manufactured in its Ugandan plant.

Ownership
The company is a member of the Midland Group of companies, a conglomerate active in Africa and the Middle East. The detailed shareholding in the stock of the company as of March 2016 is shown in the table below. In 2019, Rise Fund, managed by American private equity fund TPG Capital acquired 34 percent shareholding in Pearl Dairy Farms Limited for an undisclosed amount.

Products
The factory manufactures the following products among others: (a)  full cream powdered milk (b) skimmed powdered milk (c) instant full cream powdered milk (d) UHT milk (e) ghee and (f) butter oil. The company's products are consumed locally in Uganda and exported to Comesa Countries, West Africa, India, Nepal and United Arab Emirates. In 2019, the firm began manufacturing yogurt for domestic and regional consumption. The yogurt products were developed with consultant collaboration of Cogito Food & Beverage of Auckland, New Zealand.

Diversification
In 2020, the company invested an estimated UGX:10 billion (US$2.73 million) in commercial honey farming in collaboration  with local dairy farmers. The need to diversify both the company's and farmers’ incomes, arose out the challenges that have faced the milk production and processing industry. Local over-production, limited local consumption and difficulty in securing willing regional buyers are some of the challenges. The Pearl Dairies Honey Factory is currently under construction in Mbarara, 168 miles southwest of Kampala. 

More than 10,000 dairy farmers in the south western Ugandan districts of Bushenyi,  Kabale, Kiruhura,  Lyantonde, Mbarara,  Mubende, Ntungamo,  Sheema and Rukungiri that are confronted with milk-related challenges will be introduced to honey to diversify their incomes.

As part of its diversification strategy, the company announced plans to enter new regional markets including, Ethiopia, Malawi, South Sudan and Zambia. The four leading export products for the company are (a) powdered milk (b) UHT milk (c) butter and (d) flavored milk.

In June 2021, the company unveiled a new milk-processing line capable of packaging  daily. The line, which incorporates Sweden-based Tetra Pak technology, cost USh9.25 billion (approx. US$2.6 million) to install. The UHT milk packaged on this line has a shelf-life of up to 9 months if unopened. The company also announced its entry into Ethiopia, South Sudan and Malawi.

Recent developments
In October 2021, the company exported, 50 tonnes of powdered milk, under their Lato Milk brand. The milk, in two forty-foot container trucks, was destined for Zambia by road, the first ever milk export consignment to that country, from Uganda. The shipment was part of an annual order by the Coca-Cola Beverages Zambia Limited amounting to 700 metric tonnes of powdered milk from Pearl Dairy Farms.

See also
List of milk processing companies in Uganda
Dairy industry in Uganda

References

External links
 Opportunities and challenges in Uganda's dairy industry

Mbarara
Dairy products companies of Uganda
Companies established in 2000
2000 establishments in Uganda
Agriculture companies established in 2000
Food and drink companies established in 2000